Collinas ( in  Sardinian) is a comune (municipality) in the Province of South Sardinia in the Italian region Sardinia, located about  northwest of Cagliari and about  northwest of Sanluri.

Collinas borders the following municipalities: Gonnostramatza, Lunamatrona, Mogoro, Sardara, Siddi, Villanovaforru.

Demographic evolution

References

Cities and towns in Sardinia